Joseph Kirpes (10 July 1906 – 22 April 1976) was a Luxembourgian footballer. He competed in the men's tournament at the 1928 Summer Olympics.

References

External links
 

1906 births
1976 deaths
Luxembourgian footballers
Luxembourg international footballers
Olympic footballers of Luxembourg
Footballers at the 1928 Summer Olympics
Sportspeople from Esch-sur-Alzette
Association football midfielders
Jeunesse Esch players